The following is an alphabetical list of articles related to Rivers State, Nigeria.

A
Abalama
Abonnema
Abua–Odual
Adjacent states:
Abia State
Akwa Ibom State
Anambra State
Bayelsa State
Delta State
Imo State
Aggrey Road
Agriculture in Rivers State
Ahoada East
Ahoada West
Airports in Rivers State
Akuku-Toru
Andoni
Area codes 084 and 086
Asari-Toru
Ataba
Attorney General of Rivers State

B
Bibliography of Rivers State
Bonny, Rivers State
Bori City
Buildings and structures in Rivers State
commons:Category:Buildings and structures in Rivers State
Buguma

C
Capital of Rivers State: Port Harcourt
Cities and towns in Rivers State
commons:Category:Cities in Rivers State
commons:Category:Towns in Rivers State
Chief Judge of Rivers State
Chief of Staff of Rivers State
Colleges and universities in Rivers State
commons:Category:Universities and colleges in Rivers State
Communications in Rivers State
Companies based in Rivers State
Culture in Rivers State

D
Degema, Rivers State
Deputy Governor of Rivers State

E
Economy of Rivers State
:Category:Economy of Rivers State
commons:Category:Economy of Rivers State
Education in Rivers State
:Category:Education in Rivers State
commons:Category:Education in Rivers State
Elections in Rivers State
:Category:Rivers State elections
commons:Category:Rivers State elections
Eleme, Rivers State
Emohua
Environment of Rivers State
commons:Category:Environment of Rivers State
Etche
Events in Rivers State
Executive Council of Rivers State

G
Geography of Rivers State
:Category:Geography of Rivers State
commons:Category:Geography of Rivers State
Geology of Rivers State
:Category:Geology of Rivers State
commons:Category:Geology of Rivers State
Gokana, Rivers State
Government House, Port Harcourt
Government of Rivers State  website
:Category:Government of Rivers State
commons:Category:Government of Rivers State
Governor of Rivers State
List of Governors of Rivers State

H
High Court of Rivers State
High schools in Rivers State
Higher education in Rivers State
History of Rivers State
:Category:History of Rivers State
commons:Category:History of Rivers State
House of Assembly of Rivers State

I
Igrita
Igwuruta
Ikwerre, Rivers State
Indigenous peoples of Rivers State
Islands of Rivers State

K
Kenule Beeson Saro-Wiwa Polytechnic

L
Law of Rivers State
Lists related to Rivers State:
List of Deputy Governors of Rivers State
List of airports in Rivers State
List of cities and towns in Rivers State
List of government agencies of Rivers State
List of government ministries of Rivers State
List of Governors of Rivers State
List of members of the House of Representatives of Nigeria from Rivers State
List of indigenous peoples of Rivers State
List of people from Rivers State
List of rivers of Rivers State
List of members of the Senate of Nigeria from Rivers State
List of schools in Rivers State
Local government areas of Rivers State

M
Music of Rivers State
:Category:Musicians from Rivers State
commons:Category:Musicians from Rivers State

N
Mass media in Rivers State
NG-RI – ISO 3166-2:NG region code for Rivers State
Nigeria
States of Nigeria
Nigerian National Assembly delegation from Rivers

O
Obio-Akpor 
Odili, Peter
Ogba–Egbema–Ndoni 
Ogu–Bolo
Okilo, Melford
Okrika
Omuma
Omoku 
Opobo–Nkoro
Organizations based in Rivers State
Oyigbo

P
People from Rivers State
:Category:People from Rivers State
commons:Category:People from Rivers State
:Category:People by city in Rivers State
:Category:People by local government area in Rivers State
:Category:People from Rivers State by occupation
Politics of Rivers State
:Category:Politics of Rivers State
commons:Category:Politics of Rivers State
 Port Harcourt – Capital of Rivers State
 Port Harcourt (local government area)
 Port Harcourt International Airport
 Port Harcourt Polytechnic

R
Rivers State  website
:Category:Rivers State
commons:Category:Rivers State
commons:Category:Maps of Rivers State
Rivers State College of Health Science and Technology
Rivers State University of Science and Technology
Roman Catholic Diocese of Port Harcourt

S
Saro-Wiwa, Ken
Speaker of the Rivers State House of Assembly
Structures in Rivers State
commons:Category:Buildings and structures in Rivers State

T
Tai, Rivers State
Tourism in Rivers State
commons:Category:Tourism in Rivers State
Transportation in Rivers State
commons:Category:Transport in Rivers State

U
Universities and colleges in Rivers State
commons:Category:Universities and colleges in Rivers State

V
Tourist attractions in Rivers State
commons:Category:Visitor attractions in Rivers State

W
Wikimedia
Wikimedia Commons Atlas of Rivers State
Wikimedia Commons Category:Rivers State
commons:Category:Maps of Rivers State
Wikinews:Category:Rivers State
Wikinews:Portal:Rivers State
Wikipedia Category:Rivers State

Wikipedia:WikiProject Rivers State
Wikipedia:WikiProject Rivers State#Recognized content
Wikipedia:WikiProject Rivers State#Participants

See also

Topic overview:
Rivers State
Outline of Rivers State

Bibliography of Rivers State

Rivers State
 
Rivers State